The St. Dominic Co-Cathedral (also known as Moquegua Cathedral), is the main Catholic church in the city of Moquegua in Peru. It is a property of the Catholic Church.

It is a co-cathedral that follows the Roman or Latin rite and is one of the two co-cathedrals owned by the Diocese of Tacna and Moquegua that was created in 1944 by Pope Pius XII through the bull .

It is under the pastoral responsibility of Bishop .

See also
Roman Catholicism in Peru
St. Dominic Cathedral

References

Roman Catholic cathedrals in Peru